A Brewerytown Romance is a 1914 American short silent comedy film featuring Oliver Hardy.

Plot
Jealousy brews between a dancer's boyfriend and a tango champion.

Cast
 Eva Bell as Lena Krautheimer
 Raymond McKee as Emil Schweitzer
 Frank Griffin as Tango Heinz (as Frank C. Griffin)
 Oliver Hardy as Cassidy (as Babe Hardy)

See also
 List of American films of 1914
 Oliver Hardy filmography

External links
 

1914 films
1914 comedy films
1914 short films
American silent short films
Silent American comedy films
American black-and-white films
Films directed by Frank Griffin
American comedy short films
1910s American films